Karl August Baars (also known as Kaarel August Baars; 25 March 1875 – 27 February 1942) was an Estonian lawyer and politician.

Born in the manor of Iigaste (now Valga Parish) in Kreis Dorpat on 25 March 1875 (13 March OS).

Baars was a lawyer. He was elected to the Estonian Provincial Assembly, which governed the Autonomous Governorate of Estonia between 1917 and 1919, and served as the First Assistant Chairman between 27 November 1918 and 3 February 1919. He sat on the Asutav Kogu (Constituent Assembly) and each of the first five legislatures of the newly formed Riigikogu, between 1920 and 1934. He was Minister of Finance between 26 October 1920 and 25 January 1921, and served twice as Minister of Justice: between 14 and 25 January 1921 and between 1 April and 14 May 1924.

Baars was arrested during the Soviet occupation of Estonia during the Second World War, and was sentenced to death and transported to the Kirov Oblast. He died on 27 February 1942, before the death sentence could be carried out.

References

Further reading 
 "Baars, Karl August", Eesti Biograafiline Leksikon, vol. 1 (1926), p. 36. Retrieved 25 February 2019.
 "Baars, Karl August", Eesti Biograafiline Andmebaas. Retrieved 25 February 2019.

1875 births
1942 deaths
People from Valga Parish
People from Kreis Dorpat
Estonian Labour Party politicians
National Centre Party (Estonia) politicians
Finance ministers of Estonia
Members of the Estonian Provincial Assembly
Members of the Estonian Constituent Assembly
Members of the Riigikogu, 1920–1923
Members of the Riigikogu, 1923–1926
Members of the Riigikogu, 1926–1929
Members of the Riigikogu, 1929–1932
Members of the Riigikogu, 1932–1934
University of Tartu alumni
Estonian people who died in Soviet detention
Estonian prisoners sentenced to death
Prisoners sentenced to death by the Soviet Union